Richard England (British Army officer) may refer to:

Sir Richard England (British Army officer, born 1793) (1793–1883), British Army general
Richard G. England (1750–1812), British Army officer and Lieutenant-Governor of Plymouth

See also
Richard England (disambiguation)